Py Point is a point forming the south extremity of Doumer Island, in the Palmer Archipelago. Discovered by the French Antarctic Expedition, 1903–05, and named by Charcot for Monsieur Py, president of the French Chamber of Commerce in Buenos Aires at that time.

See also
 List of lighthouses in Antarctica

References

Headlands of the Palmer Archipelago
Lighthouses in Antarctica
Doumer Island